In Stereo is a 2015 American romantic comedy film directed and written by Mel Rodriguez III. The film stars Beau Garrett, Micah Hauptman, Melissa Bolona, Aimee Mullins, and Mario Cantone.

Cast 
 Beau Garrett as Brenda Schiffer
 Micah Hauptman as David Gallo
 Melissa Bolona as Jennifer
 Aimee Mullins as Trisha Bontecou
 Mario Cantone as John Resnick
 Maggie Geha as Paula

Production 
Mel Rodriguez III made his directorial debut with the film based on his own script, and produced by Danny Roth and Damiano Tucci.

Release 
In Stereo was released domestically on July 3, 2015, by Circus Road Films.

References

External links 
 
 

2015 films
American romantic comedy films
2015 romantic comedy films
Films set in New York City
2015 directorial debut films
2010s English-language films
2010s American films